USS Minos (ARL-14) was one of 39 Achelous-class landing craft repair ships built for the United States Navy during World War II. Named for Minos (in Greek mythology, a son of Zeus and Europa, who was a king and lawgiver of Crete), she was the only U.S. Naval vessel to bear the name.

Originally laid down as LST-644 by the Chicago Bridge & Iron Company of Seneca, Illinois; launched 15 September 1944; sponsored by Miss Ruth D. Rix; redesignated USS Minos (ARL 14) effective 14 August 1944; and commissioned 26 September 1944 at New Orleans, Louisiana.

Service history

1st commission
Following commissioning, Minos sailed to Jacksonville, Florida where she completed conversion at the Gibbs Gas Engine Company. After training, she steamed to join amphibious force repair units in the Pacific. However, upon termination of hostilities, she returned home, arriving in 1946 in Green Cove Springs, Florida and decommissioning 18 June 1946 to enter the Atlantic Reserve Fleet, Charleston.

2nd commission
With the outbreak of hostilities in Korea, she was recommissioned 22 September 1950. She reported to Commander Amphibious Forces, Atlantic Fleet, at Little Creek, Virginia 6 December 1950. She took part in amphibious exercises and performed repair services for the next four years. Under the command of CDR Harold C. "Brownie" Brown, she was decommissioned 19 August 1955 at Green Cove Springs and was assigned to Sub Group 1, Florida Group, Atlantic Reserve Fleet. Minos was stricken from the Naval Vessel Register 1 January 1960 and sold to the Portsmouth Salvage Company of Virginia 18 October 1960 for scrapping.

References
 
 

Achelous-class repair ships
Achelous-class repair ships converted from LST-542-class ships
World War II auxiliary ships of the United States
Ships built in Seneca, Illinois
1944 ships
Atlantic Reserve Fleet, Green Cove Springs Group
Atlantic Reserve Fleet, Charleston Group